Dolenja Trebuša (in older sources Dolenja Tribuša) is a dispersed settlement in the Municipality of Tolmin in the Littoral region of Slovenia. It lies in the Idrijca Valley, surrounded by mountain plateaus.

The parish church in the settlement is dedicated to Saint James and belongs to the Koper Diocese.

References

External links 
Dolenja Trebuša on Geopedia

Populated places in the Municipality of Tolmin